Villecelin is a commune in the Cher department in the Centre-Val de Loire region of France.

Geography

Population

Sights
 A feudal motte at Beauvoir.
 A watermill at Beauvoir.

See also
Communes of the Cher department

References

External links

Annuaire Mairie website 

Communes of Cher (department)